Gerlach II may refer to:

 Gerlach II of Isenburg-Covern, Count of Isenburg-Covern 1158–1217
 Gerlach II of Isenburg-Arnfels, Count of Isenburg-Arnfels 1333–1379
 Gerlach II, Count of Nassau-Wiesbaden (1333–1386), ruled 1370–1386